Jack the Ripper is a six-part BBC police procedural made in 1973, in which the case of the Jack the Ripper murders is reopened and analysed by Detective Chief Superintendents Barlow and Watt (Stratford Johns and Frank Windsor, respectively). These characters were hugely popular with UK TV viewers at the time from their appearances on the long-running police series Z-Cars and its sequels Softly, Softly and Barlow at Large. The programme was presented partly as a discussion between the two principals in the present day, interspersed with dramatised-documentary scenes set in the 19th century. The series discusses suspects and conspiracies, but concludes there is insufficient evidence to determine who was Jack the Ripper. The experiment was seen to be a success, and the formula was repeated in 1976 with Second Verdict, in which Barlow and Watt cast their gaze over miscarriages of justice and unsolved mysteries from the past.

Cast

 Stratford Johns as DCS Charlie Barlow
 Frank Windsor as DCS John Watt
 Gordon Christie as Inspector Abberline
 Hugo De Vernier as Albert Cadoche
 Christopher Fenwick as John Richardson
 Chris Gannon as Timothy Donovan
 Gabrielle Hamilton as Mrs. Richardson
 Basil Henson as Sir Charles Warren
 Julie May as Mrs Fiddymont
 Geoffrey Rose as Dr. Bagster Phillips
 Rosalind Ross as Elizabeth Long
 Hilary Sesta as Catherine Eddowes
 Peter Spraggon as Sergeant Thicke
 Varley Thomas as Emily Holland
 Kenneth Thornett as PC Neil
 Gabor Vernon as Louis Diemschütz
 Wendy Williams as Mrs Barnett

Episodes

Release
Jack the Ripper was made available for syndication. It was first distributed by 20th Century-Fox Television, in cooperation with Metromedia.

When televised in the United States, it featured Sebastian Cabot as host-narrator, and was broadcast variably using the title The Whitechapel Murders or the original Jack the Ripper.

The series was also adapted into a book titled The Ripper File authored by series script writers Elwyn Jones and John Lloyd. The 1979 film Murder by Decree, starring Christopher Plummer as Sherlock Holmes investigating the Whitechapel murders, was based on The Ripper File.

References

External links
 

1970s British television miniseries
Television series about Jack the Ripper
1973 British television series debuts
1973 British television series endings
1970s British police procedural television series
English-language television shows
British television spin-offs